Zono Inc. was an American video game developer based in El Segundo, California. The company was founded on July 25, 1991, by Ed Zobrist and William Novak, originally located in Costa Mesa, California. They are best known for their 2000 real-time strategy game Metal Fatigue.

In 2005, Zono was acquired by MumboJumbo and renamed MumboJumbo LA. In 2007, the company was moved to El Segundo, California. In December 2007, MumboJumbo closed MumboJumbo LA and terminated all employees.

Games 

Video game companies established in 1991
Video game companies disestablished in 2007
Defunct video game companies of the United States
Video game development companies
1991 establishments in California